I Live My Life is a 1935 American comedy-drama film starring Joan Crawford, Brian Aherne, and Frank Morgan, and is based on the story "Claustrophobia" by A. Carter Goodloe.

Plot summary
Kay Bentley (Joan Crawford), a bored socialite seeks a more fulfilling life, and goes on a Greek holiday. While on vacation, Kay falls for Terry O'Neill (Brian Aherne), an archaeologist who challenges Kay's beliefs, yet, also falls for her enough to follow her home. He feels awkward in Kay's flighty, social circles; yet, they become engaged to marry. Kay and Terry continue to quarrel over their differing lifestyles. But eventually, they reach a compromise and do marry in the end.

Cast
 Joan Crawford as Kay Bentley
 Brian Aherne as Terence "Terry" O'Neill
 Frank Morgan as G. P. Bentley
 Aline MacMahon as Betty Collins
 Eric Blore as Grove, Bentley's Butler
 Fred Keating as Gene Piper
 Jessie Ralph as Kay's Grandmother
 Arthur Treacher as Gallup, Mrs. Gage's Butler
 Frank Conroy as Doctor
 Etienne Girardot as Professor
 Esther Dale as Brumbaugh, Mrs. Gage's Housekeeper
 Hale Hamilton as Uncle Carl
 Hilda Vaughn as Miss Ann Morrison
 Frank Shields as Outer Office Secretary
 Sterling Holloway as Max

Box office
According to MGM records, the film earned $921,000 in the US and Canada, and $557,000 elsewhere, resulting in a profit of $384,000.

References

External links
 
 
 
 

1935 films
1935 comedy-drama films
American comedy-drama films
American black-and-white films
Metro-Goldwyn-Mayer films
Films scored by Dimitri Tiomkin
Films directed by W. S. Van Dyke
Films with screenplays by Joseph L. Mankiewicz
1930s English-language films
1930s American films